The Hyaloscyphaceae are a family of fungi in the Helotiales order. Species in this family have a cosmopolitan distribution, and are saprobic, growing on dead wood and other plant matter.

Genera 
According to the 2007 Outline of Ascomycota, the following genera are in the family Hyaloscyphaceae.

Aeruginoscyphus  (1)
Ambrodiscus  (1)
Arbusculina  (2)
Betulina (2)
Calyptellopsis  (1) 
Chrysothallus  (14)
Ciliosculum  (1)
Cistella  (49)
Clavidisculum  (8)
Dematioscypha  (7)
Didonia  (7)
Dimorphotricha  (1)
Echinula  (1)
Fuscolachnum  (7)
Graddonidiscus  (3)
Hegermila  (4)
Hyalopeziza  (25)
Hyaloscypha  (100+)
Incrupila  (12)
Olla  (10)
Otwaya  (1)
Pilatia  (4)
Polaroscyphus  (1)
Polydesmia  (6)
Proprioscypha  (2)
Protounguicularia  (8)
Psilocistella  (12)
Pubigera  (1)
Unguicularia  (12)
Unguiculariella  (1)
Unguiculella  (14)
Urceolella  (44)

Figures in brackets are approx. how many species per family.

Former genera; as accepted by Species Fungorum (2022);
 Amicodisca now in Amicodiscaceae family
 Antinoa now in Pezizellaceae family
 Arachnopeziza now in Arachnopezizaceae family
 Asperopilum now in Lachnaceae family
 Austropezia now in Pezizellaceae 
 Brunnipila now in Lachnaceae
 Bryoglossum now in Bryoglossaceae family 
 Calycellina now in Pezizellaceae
 Calycina now in Pezizellaceae (as well as others)
 Capitotricha now in Lachnaceae
 Ciliolarina now in Hamatocanthoscyphaceae family
 Cistellina now in Hyphodiscaceae family
 Dasyscyphella now in Lachnaceae
 Eriopezianow in Arachnopezizaceae
 Hamatocanthoscypha now in Hamatocanthoscyphaceae
 Hyalacrotes now in Calloriaceae family
 Hydrocina now in Hydrocinaceae family
 Hyphodiscus now in Hyphodiscaceae family
 Incrucipulum now in Lachnaceae
 Lachnaster now in Lachnaceae
 Lachnellula now in Lachnaceae
 Lachnum (synonymous with Dasyscyphus and Belonidium) now in Lachnaceae
 Lasiobelonium now in Solenopeziaceae
 Microscypha now in Hamatocanthoscyphaceae
 Mollisina now in Pezizellaceae
 Neodasyscypha now in Lachnaceae
 Parachnopeziza now in Arachnopezizaceae
 Phaeoscypha now in Pezizellaceae
 Perrotia now in Lachnaceae (and others)
 Pithyella now in Helotiaceae (and others)
 Proliferodiscus now in Lachnaceae
 Psilachnum now in Pezizellaceae
 Rodwayella now in Pezizellaceae
 Solenopezia now in Solenopeziaceae
 Tapesina now in Pezizellaceae
 Trichopeziza now in Lachnaceae (and many others)
 Velutaria now in Pezizellaceae
 Venturiocistella'' now in Hyphodiscaceae

References 

 
Helotiales
Taxa named by John Axel Nannfeldt
Taxa described in 1932